Times Square is a split EP featuring two Bobby Steele bands, the Undead and Times Square, released in 2000. The track "Bullet" is a cover of a song by Steele's prior band, the Misfits.

Track listing
The Undead - "Undead" (live)
The Undead - "Bullet" (live)
Times Square - "Hipocritic Liberal"
Times Square - "42nd Street"

Musicians
The Undead:
 Bobby Steele - vocals, guitar
 Ian Lawrence - bass
 Jaw - drums

Times Square:
 Jill Matthews - vocals, guitar 
 Bobby Steele - bass, vocals
 Dave Ari - drums

The Undead albums
2000 EPs
Horror punk EPs